Sans fil was a daily newspaper published from Paris, France, founded in 1922. The newspaper was published by the "Sans Fil" Information Agency. As of the mid-1930s, Albert Ebingre served as general director of the newspaper and Victor Pardon as its editor-in-chief. Key contributors included Egdar Allix (Professor of Law) and Bastid (Member of Parliament, head of the Foreign Affairs Commission).

References

1922 establishments in France
Newspapers published in Paris
Newspapers established in 1922
Defunct newspapers published in France
Publications with year of disestablishment missing
Daily newspapers published in France